José Elias may refer to:

José Elías (c. 1678–c. 1755), Catalan organist and composer
José Luis Elias (born 1954), Peruvian sprinter
José Miguel Elías (born 1977), Spanish cyclist